"Drive You Mad" is a song recorded by Australian singer-songwriter Amy Shark. It was released on 14 July 2017 as the third and final single from her extended play Night Thinker. Shark said "Drive You Mad" is her favourite song off the EP.

Shark explains the song "It was a realisation I had of me as a person. A bit of me acknowledging to people close to me that I know I'm not easy, I'm not the easiest daughter or friend or wife, I know I'm hard work. Hence the "drive you mad". It's like an ode to them."

In August 2017 Shark explained "I remember the particular day I wrote "Drive You Mad" was a real self-help day. I was looking at myself going, “wow, you’re being a real bitch to everyone,” – you know when you take a real hard look at yourself? There were so many arguments, and one day I was like, “I probably was a bit harsh there... I was just having this big realisation of how [imperfect] I am as a human, and I don’t know, it just sort of came out as "Drive You Mad"."

Music video

The music video for "Drive You Mad" was directed by Shark ( Amy Billings) and released on YouTube on 31 July 2018. The clip plays on the theme of being hounded by one's own skeletons, both metaphorically and physically.

At the ARIA Music Awards of 2017 it was nominated for ARIA Award for Best Video for Billings.

Track listing
 "Drive You Mad"  - 3:30

Charts

Release history

References
 

2017 singles
2017 songs
Amy Shark songs
Sony Music Australia singles
Song recordings produced by Dann Hume
Songs written by Amy Shark